The 1980 Pau Grand Prix was a Formula Two motor race held on 25 May 1980 at the Pau circuit, in Pau, Pyrénées-Atlantiques, France. The Grand Prix was won by Richard Dallest, driving the AGS. Siegfried Stohr finished second and Brian Henton third.

Classification

Race

References

Pau Grand Prix
1980 in French motorsport